UFC Fight Night: Gane vs. Tuivasa (also known as UFC Fight Night 209 and UFC on ESPN+ 67) was a mixed martial arts event produced by the Ultimate Fighting Championship that took place on September 3, 2022, at Accor Arena in Paris, France.

Background

This event marked the organization's debut in France. After a long political battle, mixed martial arts was legalized in the country in 2020 after the French National Olympic and Sports Committee gave its approval to the French Ministry of Sport's decision to allow it under the jurisdiction of the French Boxing Federation.

A heavyweight bout between former interim UFC Heavyweight Champion Ciryl Gane and Tai Tuivasa headlined the event.

A middleweight bout between former UFC Middleweight Champion Robert Whittaker (also The Ultimate Fighter: The Smashes welterweight winner) and former title challenger Marvin Vettori took place at the event. The pairing was originally scheduled for UFC 275, but Whittaker withdrew due to injury.

Former UFC Women's Flyweight Championship challenger Katlyn Chookagian was expected to face Manon Fiorot in a women's flyweight bout at the event. However, Chookagian withdrew due to unknown reasons in mid June and was replaced by former UFC Women's Strawweight Champion Jéssica Andrade. In turn, Andrade withdrew in mid July due to undisclosed reasons and Chookagian stepped back into the original pairing. The promotion then opted to postpone the contest to UFC 280 in October.

Christos Giagos was expected to face Benoît Saint-Denis in a lightweight bout. However, Giagos pulled out in early August after severing a tendon of his little finger during a domestic accident. Saint-Denis faced Gabriel Miranda instead.

A welterweight bout between Darian Weeks (MMA record: 5–2) and former two-time Glory Welterweight Champion Cédric Doumbé (MMA record: 2–0) was scheduled for the event. However the fight was cancelled after the French MMA Federation (FMMAF) would not sanction the bout per the commission's rule that fighters with less than ten professional bouts must not have more than a four fight differential between them. Weeks was later rescheduled to face Yohan Lainesse at UFC 279, one week later from this event. Doumbé was then supposedly released by the organization, a rumor he denies.

A middleweight bout between Makhmud Muradov and Abusupiyan Magomedov was expected to take place at the event. However, Muradov withdrew due to injury was replaced by Dustin Stoltzfus.

A bantamweight bout between Taylor Lapilus and Khalid Taha was expected to take place at this event. However, the week before the event, Lapilus withdrew due to a broken hand. Taha faced promotional newcomer Cristian Quiñónez instead.

Zarah Fairn Dos Santos and Ailin Perez were scheduled to meet in a women's featherweight bout at the event. However, Fairn was pulled from the event for unknown reasons and replaced by Stephanie Egger.

A featherweight bout between Ricardo Ramos and Danny Henry was expected to take place at the event. However, the bout was cancelled after both fighters got injured.

Results

Bonus awards
The following fighters received $50,000 bonuses.
 Fight of the Night: Ciryl Gane vs. Tai Tuivasa
 Performance of the Night: Abus Magomedov and Benoît Saint-Denis

See also 

 List of UFC events
 List of current UFC fighters
 2022 in UFC

References 

UFC Fight Night
2022 in mixed martial arts
September 2022 events in France
Sports competitions in Paris
Mixed martial arts in France